Ayn al-Shiqaq (also spelled Ain al-Shiqaq) is a village in northwestern Syria, administratively part of the Jableh District in the Latakia Governorate, located south of Latakia. Nearby localities include Zama to the southeast, al-Qassabin to the south, Siyano to the southwest, Jableh to the west, Qardaha to the northeast, al-Budi and Harf al-Musaytirah to the east. According to the Syria Central Bureau of Statistics, Ayn al-Shiqaq had a population of 4,125 in the 2004 census. It is the administrative center of the Ayn al-Shiqaq nahiyah ("subdistrict") which contains 15 localities with a total population of 16,031 in 2004. The inhabitants are predominantly Alawites. Ayn al-Shiqaq is the birthplace of noted Syrian poet Nadim Muhammad (1907-1994).

References

Bibliography

Populated places in Jableh District
Towns in Syria
Alawite communities in Syria